Baba Meydan or Babameydan, also known as Ba Meydan, may refer to:
 Baba Meydan-e Olya
 Baba Meydan-e Sofla
 Baba Meydan-e Zirrah